Isak Doera (September 29, 1931 – May 19, 2012) was an Indonesian Roman Catholic bishop.

Ordained in 1959, Doera was named a bishop of the Roman Catholic Diocese of Sintang, Indonesia in 1976. He resigned in 1996. He died on May 19, 2012 in Jakarta due to complications of his diseases and nervous problems.

Notes

1931 births
2012 deaths
20th-century Roman Catholic bishops in Indonesia
People from East Nusa Tenggara